Cynoglossum zeylanicum, also called the Ceylon hound's tongue, Ceylon forget-me-not, and Indian hound's tongue, is a species of flowering plant in the family Boraginaceae. It is found throughout Asia. It has also been introduced to the Americas.

Description
Ceylon's hound's tongue is similar in appearance to Cynoglossum lanceolatum, but has larger flowers that are 4–5 mm across. The fruits are small, about 2 mm across.

Distribution
It is native to Afghanistan, Pakistan, India, Nepal, Sri Lanka, Southeast Asia, China, Taiwan, Japan, and South Korea. It has been introduced to North America, the Caribbean, and South America. It occurs at altitudes of 1,200-4,100 m.

References

zeylanicum
Flora of India (region)
Flora of Japan
Flora of China
Flora of Taiwan
Flora of South Korea